The men's 5000 metres event at the 1970 British Commonwealth Games was held at the Meadowbank Stadium in Edinburgh, Scotland, with the final on 25 July. It was the first time that the metric distance was contested at the Games replacing the 3 miles.

Medalists

Results

Heats
Qualification: First 7 in each heat (Q) qualify directly for the final.

Final

References

Australian results

Athletics at the 1970 British Commonwealth Games
1970